Duoshan Town is a rural town in Lengshuijiang, Loudi City, Hunan Province, People's Republic of China.

History
In 2015, Yankou Town was merged into Duoshan Town.

Administrative division
The town is divided into 17 villages and 1 community, the following areas: Duoshan Community, Beiyuan Village, Chengshan Village, Daping Village, Helin Village, Huaqiao Village, Longguang Village, Longtanshan Village, Meishan Village, Qinglong Village, Shiwan Village, Shixi Village, Shizhu Village, Tangxi Village, Wangjia Village, Xianyi Village, Xinfeng Village, and Xintai Village (铎山社区、北元村、城山村、大坪村、合林村、花桥村、龙光村、龙潭山村、眉山村、青龙村、石湾村、石溪村、石柱村、塘溪村、王家村、咸宜村、新枫村、新台村).

Transportation
The Provincial Highway S312, commonly abbreviated as "S312", is a northeast–southwest highway passing through the town.

References

Divisions of Lengshuijiang